Penicillium subspinulosum is a species of fungus in the genus Penicillium which was isolated from soil in Poland.

References

subspinulosum
Fungi described in 2014